The Amiot, later known as the Amiot-Peneau, was a French tractor-type vehicle manufactured in Asnières-sur-Seine from 1897 to 1902.  It was not an automobile per se; rather, it was a front-wheel-drive power pack used to convert horse-drawn carriages into motor cars. These devices were quite popular  at the time in France and were known as "avant-train", and the Amiot was one of the first on the market.

The original Amiot was a four-wheeled unit with a  Cyclope or Augé engine; an electric version was also manufactured. The Amiot-Peneau was two-wheeled.

See also
 Latil
 Ponsard-Ansaloni
 Ponts-Moteurs

External reference
 Beaulieu Encyclopedia of the Automobile. Editor Nick Georgano. Stationery Office, London. 

1890s cars
Defunct motor vehicle manufacturers of France
Vehicle manufacturing companies established in 1897